Şenkal Atasagun (born 1941, Kars) is a former Turkish civil servant. He was head of the National Intelligence Organization (MİT) from 1998 to 2005.

Atasagun joined MIT in 1967 after graduating from Galatasaray High School and Grenoble University. During his career he served in Brussels and London as well as Istanbul and Ankara, before being appointed head of MIT in 1998.

References 

1941 births
Living people
People from Kars
Grenoble Alpes University alumni
People of the National Intelligence Organization (Turkey)
Directors of intelligence agencies